Turong Tousvasu (born 4 September 1930) is a Thai former sports shooter. He competed in the 300 metre rifle event at the 1964 Summer Olympics.

References

External links
  

1930 births
Possibly living people
Turong Tousvasu
Turong Tousvasu
Shooters at the 1964 Summer Olympics
Place of birth missing (living people)